The Greater Seattle Bureau of Fearless Ideas (formerly 826 Seattle) is a nonprofit organization located in Seattle, Washington dedicated to supporting students ages 6 to 18 with their creative and expository writing skills, and to helping teachers inspire their students to write. Services are structured around the belief that great leaps in learning can happen with one-on-one attention, and that strong writing skills are fundamental to future success.

Bureau of Fearless Ideas headquarters is located in the Greenwood neighborhood of Seattle. The organization manages a retail store at the location called the "Greenwood Space Travel Supply Company", which sells space-themed novelties and toys; the store's revenues benefit the organization. The organization was previously a part of 826 National prior to 2014.

In 2011 First Lady Michelle Obama presented the organization with one of 12 National Arts and Humanities Youth Program Awards, part of the President's Committee on the Arts and Humanities.

As of 2015, the Bureau employs David Schmader formerly of Seattle's The Stranger alt-weekly.

References

External links
The Greater Seattle Bureau of Fearless Ideas
Greenwood Space Travel Supply Co.

Education in Seattle
Non-profit organizations based in Seattle